Maximilian Simon (born 8 June 1844 in Kołobrzeg; died 15 January 1918 in Strasbourg) was a German historian of mathematics and mathematics teacher. He was concerned mostly with mathematics in the antiquity.

Born into a Jewish family, he studied from 1862 to 1866 at the Friedrich Wilhelm University of Berlin, obtaining his Ph.D. from Karl Weierstrass und Ernst Eduard Kummer
He was a mathematics teacher in Berlin from 1868 to 1871, and in Strasbourg from 1871 to 1912, where he became an honorary professor of the university.

Works
 Euclid und die sechs planimetrischen Bücher, Teubner 1901
 Über die Entwicklung der Elementargeometrie im 19 Jahrhundert, Bericht der Deutschen Mathematikervereinigung, Teubner 1906
 Geschichte der Mathematik im Altertum in Verbindung mit antiker Kulturgeschichte, Berlin: B. Cassirer 1909
 Nichteuklidische Geometrie in elementarer Behandlung ( ed.), Teubner 1925
 Analytische Geometrie der Ebene, 3rd edition,  1900
 Analytische Geometrie des Raumes, 2 volumes, Sammlung Göschen 1900, 1901

References

 Joseph W. Dauben, Christoph J. Scriba (eds.): Writing the history of mathematics. Its historical development. Birkhäuser, Basel 2002, (Science networks 27), p. 522.

19th-century German Jews
19th-century German mathematicians
1844 births
1918 deaths
University of Strasbourg alumni
20th-century German mathematicians